Paracobitis atrakensis is a species of stone loach, found in the Atrek and Bidvaz rivers drainage areas in northeastern Iran.

References

atrakensis
Fish of Asia
Fish of Iran
Taxa named by Hamid Reza Esmaeili
Taxa named by Hamed Mousavi-Sabet
Taxa named by Golnaz Sayyadzadeh
Taxa named by Saber Vatandoust
Taxa named by Jörg Freyhof
Fish described in 2014